Nuon (stylized as NUON) is a technology developed by VM Labs that adds features to a DVD player. In addition to viewing DVDs, one can play 3D video games and use enhanced DVD navigational tools such as zoom and smooth scanning of DVD playback. One could also play CDs while the Nuon graphics processor generates synchronized graphics on the screen. There were plans to provide Internet access capability in the next generation of Nuon-equipped DVD players.

History

Nuon was first unveiled under the codename "Project X", and was featured in Electronic Gaming Monthlys 1999 Video Game Buyer's Guide. One of the Nuon's main software developers was Jeff Minter, who created a version of Tempest titled Tempest 3000 for the system and the built-in VLM-2 audio visualizer. Manufacturing of the hardware was handled by several original equipment manufacturers.

When it was first announced, the Nuon's creators envisioned it as a competitor for the upcoming video game consoles from the leading manufacturers. However, the Nuon platform was primarily marketed as an expanded DVD format. A large majority of Nuon players that were sold in fact resembled typical consumer DVD players with the only noticeable difference being a Nuon logo. Nuon players offered a number of features that were not available on other DVD players when playing standard DVD-formatted titles. These included very smooth forward and reverse functionality and the ability to smoothly zoom in and out of sections of the video image. In addition, Nuon provided a software platform to DVD authors to provide interactive software like features to their titles.

In North America, Nuon was used in the Samsung DVD-N501 and DVD-N2000 models; they also released several models in other parts of the world: DVD-N504 (Europe), DVD N505 (Europe), and DVD-N591 (Korea). Toshiba released the SD-2300 DVD player, and there are two RCA models, the DRC300N and DRC480N. The Nuon was also used in Motorola's Streamaster 5000 "Digital DNA" set-top box.

Nuon was created by VM Labs, whose assets were sold to Genesis Microchip in April 2002. By November 2004, there were no Nuon-enabled DVD players shipping and no new Nuon software titles released or in development.

Specification

32/128 bit 54 MHz or 108 MHz quad-core VM labs Nuon MPE hybrid stack processor (Media Processing Element, supporting 128-bit SIMD floating point and 32-bit integer but both share the same IEEE 754 floating point register stack to store both flop and integer instructions similar to the Intel MMX technology through context switching. Each contains a 128-bytes unified cache, with 32-kilobyte shared cache (32-bit SRAM block) and maximum 2 GB physical memory addresses. Some report(s) suggested that a certain model had sported a 333+ MHz clock frequency but it was never released widely.
MCS-251 microcontroller for background task
32-megabyte 8-bit Fast Page DRAM at 33 MHz, 512-kilobytes sound RAM and 24-kilobytes programmable ROM
2x 3d Media GL MPE with 8-megabyte 32bit video ram at 66mhz.
64~256 MB writable rom and optional hard drive (up to 137 GB)   
Optical drive support DVD or CD-R

Peripherals and accessories
Peripherals for Nuon-enhanced DVD players included the following:

Logitech Gamepad
Pro-elite controller
AirPlay wireless controller
Stealth controller
Warrior Digital-D pad
controller extension cable
port replicator to move the Nuon ports to anywhere desired

Released movies
Only four DVD releases utilized Nuon technology. All of them were released by 20th Century Fox Home Entertainment:

The Adventures of Buckaroo Banzai Across the 8th Dimension
Bedazzled (2000 remake)
Dr. Dolittle 2
Planet of the Apes (2001 remake, Bug Free Version UPC - 2454302898)

Released games
Only eight games were officially released for the Nuon:
Tempest 3000
Freefall 3050 A.D.
Merlin Racing (later had a sequel entitled Miracle Space Race for the PlayStation)
Space Invaders X.L.
Iron Soldier 3 (later recalled due to incompatibility with some players)
Ballistic (only available with Samsung players)
The Next Tetris DLX (only available with Toshiba players)
Crayon Shin-chan 3 (Korean-only release)

Collections and samplers
Interactive Sampler (three different versions)
Nuon Games + Demos (collection from Nuon-Dome)
Nuon-Dome PhillyClassic 5 Demo Disc (giveaway collection)

Homebrew development
During late 2001, VM Labs released a homebrew SDK which allowed people to be able to program apps/games for their Nuon system. Only the Samsung DVD-N501/DVDN504/DVDN505 and RCA DRC300N/DRC480N can load homebrew games.

Some homebrew titles have been created for or ported to Nuon.  They are not commercially available and require the user to burn the material to a Nuon-compatible CD-R.

References

External links
 NUON's homepage (archived August 2002) 
 Nuon—Dome Page
 Nuon Alumni Page
 Entry at Video Game Console Library
 Entry At Giant Bomb
 "A Fan’s History – The NUON" blog post at arcryphongames.wordpress.com (Dated February 22, 2015. It has a copious amount of embedded video links and media shots.)

DVD
DVD interactive technology
Home video game consoles
Sixth-generation video game consoles
2000 introductions
Discontinued video game consoles